General Blair may refer to:

Chandos Blair (1919–2011), British Army lieutenant general
Charles F. Blair Jr. (1909–1978), U.S. Air Force brigadier general
Charles W. Blair (1829–1899), Union Army brevet brigadier general
Francis Preston Blair Jr. (1821–1875), Missouri Volunteers major general in the Civil War
James Blair (Indian Army officer) (1828–1905), British Indian Army general
James Blair (South Carolina politician) (1786–1834), South Carolina Militia general
William H. Blair (1821–1888), Pennsylvania Volunteer Infantry post-service brevet brigadier general

See also
Attorney General Blair (disambiguation)